Ilie Oană (16 August 1918 – 27 April 1993) was a football player and manager.

Club career
Ilie Oană was born on 16 August 1918, being nicknamed "Americanul" (The American) because his place of birth was in Indiana Harbor to Romanian parents who emigrated from Transylvania before the outbreak of World War I. In 1921, his parents moved back to their homeland, settling in Sibiu after the 1918 Union of Transylvania with Romania. Oană began his football career in 1935 with local side Șoimii Sibiu in Divizia B. He then joined Divizia A club, Juventus București where he made his debut under player-coach Coloman Braun-Bogdan on 12 September 1937 in a 6–2 away loss in front of Universitatea Cluj. In following years, Oană was an important member of the team, consolidating his place in the first 11, however the team's results were poorer season after season, eventually relegating by the end of the 1939–40 season but he stayed with the club helping it promote after one season by contributing with 9 goals scored in 7 appearances, however the team did not get to play in the following season in Divizia A as the championship was interrupted because of World War II. In the first season after the war, Oană played 14 games in the 1945–46 București championship, scoring 11 goals that helped Juventus earn a position at the end of the season that granted the participation in the 1946–47 Divizia A season. He stayed with Juventus, playing Divizia A football until his retirement in 1951.

International career
Ilie Oană made two appearances for Romania, making his debut under coach Virgil Economu in a friendly which ended 2–2 against Hungary in October 1939. He also played in a 0–0 against Poland at the 1948 Balkan Cup.

Managerial career

Ilie Oană became a football coach shortly after he retired from playing in 1952 at the club he ended his playing career, Juventus which was renamed Petrolul and moved from Bucharest to Ploiești. In his first season as the team's coach Petrolul relegated to Divizia B, so with the help of the coach from the youth center, Traian Ionescu he created a new team promoting young players like the Dridea brothers, Mircea and Virgil, Vasile Sfetcu or Constantin Tabarcea and mixed them with talents he founded in the lower leagues like Ion Zaharia or Ion Neacșu, thus forming a squad that would promote back to the first league in 1954 and win two consecutive Divizia A titles in the 1957–58 and 1958–59 seasons, also winning the 1962–63 Cupa României after a 6–1 victory against Siderurgistul Galați in the final and in the 1962–63 Inter-Cities Fairs Cup he led the team to the quarter-finals, a premiere for a Romanian team in European competitions where they were eliminated by Ferencváros. He left Petrolul after 12 years to coach Romania's national team for which he previously worked as a assistant of Gheorghe Popescu I and Silviu Ploeșteanu from 1962 until 1963, making his debut in a 3–0 home victory against Turkey at the 1966 World Cup qualifiers, during his two-year spell managing to earn victories in front of Czechoslovakia, Portugal, Switzerland or France but was dismissed after the "Zürich disaster" where he was defeated with 7–1 by Switzerland at the Euro 1968 qualifiers, having a total of 19 games at the national team consisting of 11 victories and 8 losses. He returned to coach The Yellow Wolves in the second half of the 1967–68 Divizia A season, the team finishing the season on the 5th place and in the following season barely avoiding relegation in the final round of the season. From 1969 until 1971, Ilie Oană had his only experience coaching abroad in Greece at Alpha Ethniki side, Panserraikos, afterwards returning for a third and final spell at Petrolul, leaving the team after two seasons in which it earned mediocre results. He then coached for four seasons from 1973 until 1977 Politehnica Iași, going to coach from January 1978, Universitatea Craiova with whom he won by the end of the season, the 1977–78 Cupa României after a 3–1 victory against Olimpia Satu Mare in the final. He ended his coaching career in Divizia B with two unsuccessful spells at Farul Constanța and Gloria Buzău, being unable to help them promote to the first league. Oană has a total of 572 matches as a coach in Divizia A consisting of 232 victories, 124 draws and 216 losses, which makes him the second coach with the most matches in the league, behind Florin Halagian who has 878. He died on 27 April 1993 in Bucharest, the Ilie Oană Stadium from Ploiești was named in his honor, also having a statue displayed in front of it.

Honours

Player
Petrolul Ploiești
Divizia B: 1940–41

Manager
Petrolul Ploiești
Divizia A: 1957–58, 1958–59
Divizia B: 1954
Cupa României: 1962–63
Universitatea Craiova
Cupa României: 1977–78

Notes

References

External links

Ilie Oană coaching stats in Divizia A at labtof.ro 

1918 births
1993 deaths
Romanian footballers
Romania international footballers
Liga I players
Liga II players
FC Petrolul Ploiești players
Romanian football managers
Romania national football team managers
Romanian expatriate football managers
Expatriate football managers in Greece
Panserraikos F.C. managers
FC Petrolul Ploiești managers
CS Universitatea Craiova managers
FCV Farul Constanța managers
FC Gloria Buzău managers
Association football midfielders